Caffeoylmalic acid is a hydroxycinnamic acid ester found in the leaves and flowers of Parietaria officinalis. It is also found in Chelidonium majus and Urtica dioica.

References 

Hydroxycinnamic acid esters
Vinylogous carboxylic acids